Men's discus throw events for visually impaired athletes were held at the 2004 Summer Paralympics in the Athens Olympic Stadium. Events were held in two disability classes.

F12

The F12 event was won by Sun Hai Tao, representing .

Result
27 Sept. 2004, 10:30

F13

The F13 event was won by Alexander Yasinovyi, representing .

Result
25 Sept. 2004, 11:15

References

M